In  Greek mythology, Side is a minor figure who tried to escape her enamored father and was transformed into a tree, in part of an aetiological myth that attempts to explain the nature of trees and birds. Her brief tale survives in the works of Dionysius Periegetes, an ancient Greek author who is believed to have been born in the city of Alexandria, and to have lived around the time of Roman Emperor Hadrian (reigned 117–138 AD).

Etymology 
The ancient Greek noun  translates to "pomegranate", and refers to both the tree and its fruit. Robert Beekes and Furnée suggest that all of its variant spellings (such as  síbdē,  xímba, and  síbda) point to a Pre-Greek origin of the word, and Witczak says specifically a Western Anatolian one.

Family 
The only known member of Side's family is a father named Ictinus. Nothing more is known about their family, nor is the land her myth takes place ever named, as most likely both Side and Ictinus were invented for the sake of this story.

Mythology 
According to the myth, Side's father Ictinus developed an incestuous desire for his daughter, and chased her down with the intention to rape her. Side fled from him until she reached the gravestone of her dead mother, and killed herself on it to avoid his ravenous advances. Her red blood spilt on the ground and gave rise to a pomegranate tree, while her father himself was transformed into a kite, a bird of prey which, according to Oppian, hates to rest on pomegranate trees.

Symbolism 

Karl Kerenyi compared this story to both the goddess Persephone, who was abducted to the Underworld by its king Hades and forced to stay there for several months a year thanks to her consumption of pomegranate fruit, and the hunter Orion's first wife Side, who angered Hera and was cast in Tartarus as punishment. All three stories have in common the theme of a pomegranate-related maiden who dies, either literally or metaphorically, and is led to the Underworld. In this Side's case, her father Ictinus supplants the subterranean god who seduces/rapes the maiden. Kerenyi summarized the theme as a woman who has to go down to the Underworld for the benefit of her community.

The pomegranate fruit was seen as a symbol of fertility and Aphrodite, the goddess of love and fertility, possibly because its numerable red seeds suggest procreation and sexuality; it was also used as birth-control. Most significantly when it comes to this myth, other than the connection it has to kites, is its bright red colour that resembles blood, as Side spilt her own when she took her life, which then gave rise to the tree.

An ancient Greek colony in the region of Pamphylia (on the southern coast of Anatolia/Asia Minor, now in Turkey) was called Side, and coins from that city displayed pomegranate fruits on them. Other Anatolian cities called Side include one in Caria and another in Pontus.

Side's myth has also similar elements with those of Nyctaea and Nyctimene, two other women who were transformed into something else in their effort to escape the embraces of their rapacious fathers.

See also 

 Corone
 Daphne
 Nyctaea
 Nyctimene

References

Bibliography 

 
 
 
 
 
 
 
 
 Hyginus, Gaius Julius, The Myths of Hyginus. Edited and translated by Mary A. Grant, Lawrence: University of Kansas Press, 1960.
 
 
  Online version at Perseus.tufts project.

External links 
 

Metamorphoses into trees in Greek mythology
Incest in Greek mythology
Suicides in Greek mythology
Women in Greek mythology
Incestual abuse